Gülşah Düzgün (born Gülşah Aktürk on 25 September 1995) is a Turkish female Paralympian goalball player. She is a member of the national team.

Private life
Gülşah Düzgün was born to İsmail Aktürk and his spouse Mğrvet on 25 September 1995. She completed her secondary education in a school for the blinds and visually impaired.

She is married to her club mate Tekin Okan Düzgün, also a visually impaired sportsman and a national goalball player. In 2018, she gave birth to a daughter,  Elif Bera.

Sporting career
The visually impaired girl started performing goalball in the school through her physical training teacher in 2006. She played in the beginning in the school team, and later in a club. In 2007 at age 12, she was admitted to the national team, and was coached by Alşi Tekçe. She debuted internationally at a tournament in Germany in 2009.

Düzgün competes for Kahramanmaraş Ertuğrul Gazi Disabled SK in Kahramanmaraş.

She enjoyed the champion title with the national team at the 2015 IBSA Goalball European Championships Division A in Kaunas, Lithuania, which was a qualifier competition for the 2016 Paralympics.

Düzgün was a member of the women's national goalball team at the 2016 Paralympics in Rio de Janeiro, Brazil. She won the gold medal with her teammates at the Paralympics.

Honours

International
  2012 IBSA European Goalball Championships B in Ascoli Piceno, Italy
 2013 IBSA Goalball European Championships Div. A in Konya, Turkey.
  Malmö Lady- and Men InterVup 2014, Sweden.
  2014 IBSA Goalball World Championships in Espoo, Finland
 2015 IBSA Goalball European Championships Div. A in Kaunas, Lithuania.
  2016 Summer Paralympics in Rio de Janeiro, Brazil.
  2018  IB>SA World Goalball Champşionships in Malmö, Sweden
  2019 IBSA Goalball European Champişonship in Rostock, Germany

References

Living people
1995 births
Turkish sportswomen
Turkish blind people
Female goalball players
Turkish goalball players
Goalball players at the 2016 Summer Paralympics
Paralympic gold medalists for Turkey
Medalists at the 2016 Summer Paralympics
Paralympic medalists in goalball
Paralympic goalball players of Turkey
Place of birth missing (living people)